Jean-Paul Goux (born 1948) is a French writer. He taught literature at the University of Tours for many years, and now lives in Besançon. The author of more than a dozen books, he is best known for two trilogies: 
 Les Champs de fouilles, consisting of Les Jardins de Morgante, La Commémoration, and La Maison forte
 Les Quartiers d’hiver, consisting of L’Embardée, Les Hautes falaises, and  Le Séjour à Chenecé

References

1948 births
Living people
20th-century French novelists
21st-century French novelists
20th-century French male writers
21st-century French male writers